Towey is a surname. Notable people with the surname include:

Cal Towey (born 1990), American baseball player
Frank William Towey, Jr. (1895-1979), American lawyer and politician
Gearoid Towey (born 1977), Irish Olympic athlete
Jim Towey, American government executive
John Towey (born 1940), American actor and director
Paul Towey, member of the band Tall Pony